Guido Salvini (12 May 1893 – 4 May 1965) was an Italian film director. He directed seven films from 1937 to 1955.

Filmography

References

External links 

1893 births
1965 deaths
Italian film directors